Clayesmore School is an independent school  for boys and girls, aged 2 – 18 years, in the village of Iwerne Minster, Dorset, England. It is both a day and boarding school and is a member of The Headmasters' and Headmistresses' Conference (HMC).

The school was founded by Alexander Devine in 1896 in Enfield, Middlesex. After moving to Pangbourne, Berkshire and then to Winchester, Hampshire it finally moved to Iwerne Minster for the summer term of 1933. In 1974 it was joined on the Iwerne site by Clayesmore Preparatory School, originally Charlton Marshall School, which had been founded in 1929 by R.A.L. Everett. In the following year the school became co-educational.

As of 2019 there are 430 pupils in the senior school (ages 13–18) and 200 in the prep school (ages 3–13). The current head is Joanne Thomson, and the Prep Head is Jonathon Anderson. The school is situated on a  campus, and the facilities include an astro-turf pitch, theatre, sports centre and subject facilities including an art department, science block, business school and design and technology department.

History 
For centuries the land on which Clayesmore now stands was held by Shaftesbury Abbey. After the dissolution it passed to the Bower family. Their family home was built in 1796 roughly on the site of the existing main building. In 1876 the last member of the Bower family, Captain T B Bower, sold the village and estate to George Glyn, 2nd Baron Wolverton. The Baron demolished the existing house, laid out the Iwerne estate afresh and commissioned Alfred Waterhouse to design the present building (now Wolverton, one of the female boarding houses) which was completed in 1878.

In 1904 the 4th Baron Wolverton put the whole  estate up for sale. This was bought in 1908 by James Ismay whose father, Thomas Henry Ismay, had founded the White Star Line shipping company. On Ismay's death in January 1930 the estate was put up for sale in a number of separate lots.

In 1974, Clayesmore School was merged with Charlton Marshall School, which later became Clayesmore Prep School. The school became co-educational in 1975.

Heads 
 Alexander Devine, 1896–1930
 Aubrey de Sélincourt, 1931–1935
 Evelyn Mansfield King, 1935–1945
 D Peter Burke, 1945–1966
 Roy McIssac, 1966–1979
 Michael Hawkins, 1979–1986
 David Beeby, 1986–2000
 Martin Cooke, 2000–2016
 Joanne Thomson, 2016–present

Houses 
The senior school is divided into five boarding houses; three for boys and two for girls. The three boys' houses are:
 Devine 
 Gate
 Manor

The two girls' houses are:
 King's
 Wolverton

Notable former pupils

Former pupils include:
 Geoffrey Heneage Drummond, VC 
 John Brooke-Little CVO, officer of arms and heraldry expert
 Robyn Denny, Artist
 Tony Hart, artist and creator of Morph
 Mike Scott, television presenter
 Anthony Allen, England rugby union player
 Martin Bott, geologist
 Glynn Edwards, actor
 Brian Epstein, manager of The Beatles
 John Craxton, painter
 Nicole Faraday, actress
 Johnny Martyn, singer and guitarist 
 Stephen Joseph, Pioneer of Theatre in the Round
 Augustus Casely-Hayford, Art and cultural historian 
 John Plamenatz, Political Philosopher
 Julian Rathbone, Author
 Jeremy Rogers MBE, Designer and builder of racing yachts such as Contessa 26 and Contessa 32
 George Devine CBE, Theatre Manager
 Nicholas Handy, British Theoretical Chemist
 Marcus Cheke, British Diplomat
 Eric Fernihough, Former holder of the motorcycle world speed record
 Edward Ardizzone, CBE RA Artist, writer and illustrator
 Howard Panter, Theatre impresario, Ambassador Theatre Group (ATG)
 Hugh Stewart, film editor
 Sir Rodney Sweetnam, KCVO CBE F.R.C.S. President of the Royal College of Surgeons 1995–98, Orthopaedic Surgeon to HM Queen.
 Graham Hayes, MC Commando
 David Walser, Church of England Minister, Archdeacon of Ely
 Lewis McManus, Cricket Player for Hampshire Cricket and Hampshire Hawks.

References

External links
 Independent Schools Council: Clayesmore
 Clayesmore School official website
 Old Clayesmorian Society official website

Private schools in Dorset
Educational institutions established in 1896
History of Berkshire
History of Hampshire
History of Middlesex
1896 establishments in England